Chiloglottis cornuta, commonly known as the green bird orchid, is a species of orchid found in south-eastern Australia and in New Zealand, including many of its offshore islands. It has two broad leaves and a single green or pinkish flower with six to eight rounded, flattened green, reddish or blackish calli on the labellum.

Description
The column is erect, almost as long as the dorsal sepal with broad wings on the upper half. Flowering occurs from November to February.

Taxonomy and naming
Chiloglottis cornuta was first formally described in 1844 by Joseph Dalton Hooker from a specimen collected near "Campbell's Island" and the description was published in Flora Antarctica. The specific epithet (cornuta) is a Latin word meaning "bearing horns".

Distribution and habitat
The green bird orchid grows in moist places in sheltered forest in far south-eastern New South Wales, eastern Victoria, far south-eastern South Australia and in Tasmania. In New Zealand it occurs on both the North and South Islands and on Stewart, Chatham, the Antipodes, Campbell and Auckland Islands.

References 

cornuta
Orchids of Australia
Plants described in 1844
Taxa named by Joseph Dalton Hooker